Together is an album by Dutch rock band Golden Earring, released in 1972. The album was not issued in the U.S.

Track listing
All songs written by Kooymans except where noted.

"All Day Watcher" – 4:49
"Avalanche of Love" – 4:14
"Cruisin' Southern Germany" (Hay) – 3:00
"Brother Wind" – 7:54
"Buddy Joe" – 3:48
"Jangalene" – 5:08
"From Heaven from Hell" – 6:06
"Thousand Feet Below You" – 4:11

Personnel
George Kooymans - guitar, vocals
Rinus Gerritsen - bass guitar, keyboards
Barry Hay - flute, guitar, saxophone, vocals
Cesar Zuiderwijk - drums

Production
Producer: Fred Haayen
Engineer: Frank Owen
Mastering: Hans Brethouwer
Photography: Frits Van Swoll

Charts

References

Golden Earring albums
1972 albums
Polydor Records albums